East Texas Baptist University (ETBU) is a private Baptist university in Marshall, Texas. It is affiliated with the Baptist General Convention of Texas (Southern Baptist Convention).

History

ETBU is located on the site of the former Van Zandt Farm at the highest altitude in Harrison County. ETBU was founded as the College of Marshall in 1912, after a campaign to create a Southern Baptist college in East Texas. The campus' first building, Marshall Hall, was completed in 1916. It was designed to house a gymnasium, library, chapel/theatre, administrative offices and classrooms. The College of Marshall opened the following year in 1917 as a two-year junior college and academy. The college was greatly enlarged during the tenure of President Frank Shelby Groner who served as president of the college from 1928 until 1942. It became East Texas Baptist College in 1944

In June 2015, J. Blair Blackburn, a native of Minden, Louisiana, was inaugurated as the 13th president of East Texas Baptist University. He succeeded Samuel "Dub" Oliver, who instead became in 2014 the president of Union University  in Jackson, Tennessee.

In 2015 the university applied for and received an exception to Title IX allowing it to discriminate against LGBT students for religious reasons.

Accreditation 
It is affiliated with the Baptist General Convention of Texas (Southern Baptist Convention). 

ETBU is accredited by the Commission on Colleges of the Southern Association of Colleges and Schools. It also is accredited by The Board of Nurse Examiners for the State of Texas for Bachelor of Science in Nursing (BSN), the Commissions of Collegiate Nursing Education, and the National Association of Schools of Music.

Campus

Security 
During the day, the campus is patrolled by the on-campus security officer. Security cameras record 24 hours a day and are monitored from 8:00 am – 10:00 pm. Call boxes are placed in strategic locations around campus. At night, the campus is monitored by private security officers (off-duty Marshall City Police Officers).

Academic buildings 

Marshall Hall
Scarborough Hall
Rogers Spiritual Life Center
Ornelas Student Center
Dean Healthplex
Craig Hall
Harvey Daniel Bruce Hall
Murphy Science Building
Bennett Student Commons
Redwine Instrumental Music Building
Jenna Guest Music Building
Fred Hale Business Building
Mamye Jarrett Library
Meadows Hall

Residence halls 
Centennial Hall
Feagin Hall
Fry Hall
Linebery Hall
Mabee Housing Complex
Ornelas Residential Center
Oaks on Grove
University Apartments
University Park Row Apartments

Athletics

Men's athletics 

Football
Basketball
Baseball
Cross Country
Track & Field
Soccer
Tennis
Ice Hockey
Bass Fishing
Golf
Lacrosse

Women's athletics 
 Basketball
 Cross-Country
Track & Field
 Soccer
 Softball
 Tennis 
 Volleyball
Cheerleading
Pom
Aerobics and Tumbling

Intramural Sports
 Basketball
 Flag-Football
 Kickball
 Soccer
 Softball
 Volleyball

Mascot 
The mascot for ETBU is a tiger, "Toby" and recently added, "Tabby."  ETBU also has a live Tiger mascot named "Sarge" who is housed off campus.

Notable alumni
Rick Edmonds, Southern Baptist pastor and since 2016 the District 66 member of the Louisiana House of Representatives in East Baton Rouge Parish. 
Sam B. Hall, member of the United States House of Representatives (1976–85) and United States District Judge (1985-94).
Cameron McCasland, Emmy-nominated film and television producer 
Chris Dier, Author of  “The 1868 St. Bernard Parish Massacre: Blood in the Cane Fields,” and 2020 Louisiana State Teacher of the Year.

Sponsored Christian camps
As of 2019, East Texas Baptist sponsors Mission 58 Christian Camps.

Gallery

References

External links
 
 
 East Texas Baptist athletics website

 
1912 establishments in Texas
Buildings and structures in Harrison County, Texas
Council for Christian Colleges and Universities
Educational institutions established in 1912
Education in Harrison County, Texas
Marshall, Texas
Private universities and colleges in Texas
Universities and colleges accredited by the Southern Association of Colleges and Schools
Universities and colleges affiliated with the Baptist General Convention of Texas
Universities and colleges affiliated with the Southern Baptist Convention